John of Pontoise (a.k.a. John de Pontissara; died 1304) was a medieval Bishop of Winchester in England.

Life
John of Pontoise was from Pontoise in Seine-et-Oise in France, but spent much of his life in England. In 1280, he was briefly Chancellor of the University of Oxford. He was an Archdeacon of Exeter and a papal chaplain before Pope Martin IV provided him to the see of Winchester on 9 June 1282; he was consecrated before 15 June 1282. He was enthroned at Winchester Cathedral in September 1282.

John of Pontoise died on 4 December 1304.

Citations

References
 British History Online Bishops of Winchester accessed on 2 November 2007

13th-century births
Year of birth unknown
1304 deaths
People from Pontoise
French expatriates in England
French chaplains
Archdeacons of Exeter
Bishops of Winchester
Chancellors of the University of Oxford
13th-century French Roman Catholic priests
13th-century English Roman Catholic bishops
14th-century English Roman Catholic bishops